Bactrocythara is a genus of small sea snails, marine gastropod mollusks in the family Mangeliidae.

Species
Species within the genus Bactrocythara include:
 Bactrocythara agachada Rolán, Otero-Schmitt & Fernandes, 1994
 Bactrocythara asarca (Dall & Simpson, 1901)
 † Bactrocythara ascara (W.H. Dall & C.T. Simpson, 1900)
 Bactrocythara candeana (d'Orbigny, 1847)
 Bactrocythara cryera (Dall, 1927)
 Bactrocythara haullevillei (Dautzenberg, 1912)
 Bactrocythara labiosa (Smith E. A., 1872)
 † Bactrocythara obtusa (R.J.L. Guppy, 1896) 
Species brought into synonymy
 Bactrocythara thielei J. Knudsen, 1952: synonym of Bactrocythara labiosa (E.A. Smith, 1872)

References

 W.P. Woodring. 1928. Miocene Molluscs from Bowden, Jamaica. Part 2: Gastropods and discussion of results . Contributions to the Geology and Palaeontology of the West Indies
 Rolán E., 2005. Malacological Fauna From The Cape Verde Archipelago. Part 1, Polyplacophora and Gastropoda.

External links
  Bouchet P., Kantor Yu.I., Sysoev A. & Puillandre N. (2011) A new operational classification of the Conoidea. Journal of Molluscan Studies 77: 273-308.
  Tucker, J.K. 2004 Catalog of recent and fossil turrids (Mollusca: Gastropoda). Zootaxa 682:1-1295.
 Worldwide Mollusk Data base : Mangeliidae
 Todd, Jonathan A. "Systematic list of gastropods in the Panama Paleontology Project collections." Budd and Foster 2006 (1996)

 
Gastropod genera